Westwoods is an unincorporated community in Sussex County, Delaware, United States. Westwoods is located along state routes 26 and 30, southwest of Millsboro and north of the Maryland border.

References

Unincorporated communities in Sussex County, Delaware
Unincorporated communities in Delaware